B.S. I Love You is a 1971 American comedy-drama film directed and written by Steven Hilliard Stern and starring Peter Kastner. The style of the film is like many others of its era, taking its cues from The Graduate and the raunchiness of the early 1970s, as Kastner plays a youthful TV commercials producer whose quest in life is to bed as many women as possible, while trying to remain faithful to his childhood sweetheart who remains in tow, awaiting the day they will marry.

The film was released to little or no fanfare, and remains today a curious relic from the early 1970s. It is extremely hard to find, as it was never released on VHS and has not been released on DVD as of December 2018. It runs on the Fox Movie Channel from time to time, but it is an edited version (it runs 89 minutes, excising 10 minutes from the original theater release print).

Cast
Peter Kastner - Paul Bongard
Joanna Cameron - Michele Ink
Louise Sorel - Ruth
Gary Burghoff - Ted Bufman
Joanna Barnes - Jane Ink
Richard B. Shull - Finley Harris

Reception
Howard Thompson of The New York Times was positive, writing: "With young Mr. Kastner appealingly front and center, the movie skips along jauntily, wisely and amusingly, reined in by a snug cluster of key performances and the pointed, tart dialogue." Gene Siskel of the Chicago Tribune gave the film one star out of four and called it "one of those run-thru-the-park youth films in which a 25-year old male comes to realize that life isn't about ladder climbing in an advertising agency, but love, love, love. It's a better sentiment than a movie." Charles Champlin of the Los Angeles Times called the film "an enjoyment, not a masterpiece, innocently sexy and nicely witty, and with an engaging and talented cast." David McGillivray of The Monthly Film Bulletin wrote: "Any film which shouts this loudly must, one feels, be trying to say something. Yet unless one can count a message which filters through about love being more important than financial gain, nothing very specific emerges from the flamboyant imagery...not even a statement about the ruthlessness of commercial advertising."

References

External links 
 

1971 films
1971 comedy-drama films
20th Century Fox films
American comedy-drama films
American sex comedy films
1970s English-language films
Films directed by Steven Hilliard Stern
Films about advertising
Films set in New York City
1971 directorial debut films
1970s sex comedy films
1970s American films
English-language comedy-drama films